Bunloit is a village on the north western shore of Loch Ness in Inverness-shire, in the  Scottish Highlands and is part of the Scottish council area of Highland.

References

Populated places in Inverness committee area
Loch Ness